The Order of the Eagle of Georgia and the Seamless Tunic of Our Lord Jesus Christ commonly known as the Order of the Eagle of Georgia (OEG), is the highest order of chivalry awarded by Crown Prince David Bagration of Mukhrani, the order's Grand Master and a claimant to the throne of Georgia. Prince David became the disputed head of the Royal House of Bagrationi and Grand Master of the order when his father, Prince Giorgi (Jorge) Bagrationi, died.

History of the Order
The Order claims to have been founded by Queen Tamar of Georgia, and its modern history dates from when it was restored in Italy by Prince Irakli Bagration of Mukhrani in 1939 as the highest of the House Orders of the Bagrationi dynasty.

The name of the Order refers to the Sacred Tunic that Jesus Christ wore at his death. According to legend, the relic was raffled off by Roman soldiers and it was then taken to Georgia, preserved, and buried in the Svetitskhoveli Cathedral, alongside the insignias of former Kings of Georgia.

In 1942, Prince Irakli Bagration of Mukhrani was elected President of the Union of Traditionalist Georgians, who were dedicated to restoring a free Georgia under a constitutional monarchy.

Upon his death in 1977, Prince Irakli was succeeded in his claims by his first-born son, Prince Jorge de Bagration, who only awarded the Order within his family until 2001, when he decided to give concessions for excellence, merit and/or service to the Royal House and people of Georgia. After 2003, Prince Jorge gave the Order a new constitution, establishing its current terms and conditions.

During the Grand Mastership of Prince Jorge, significant figures from nobility and royalty entered the Order.

In 1991, it was reported that the Georgian Parliament acknowledged Prince Jorge Bagration of Mukhrani as the head of the Royal house of Bagrationi, but others dispute his claims. In 1995, Prince Jorge, traveled to Georgia with and met with Georgian President Eduard Shevardnadze, who declared to Prince Jorge: "My Lord, you are in your homeland which needs the Royal Family to maintain its unity."

Due to the Mukhrani's long exile in Spain, many of the Order's members are Spanish. The order is highlighted in a list of notable Orders on the Blasones Hispanos, Ordenes Dinasticas website.

Prince Jorge's son, Prince David repatriated to Georgia in 2008, one year after the Patriarch of Georgia, Ilia II, who is a holder of the Grand Collar of the Order of the Eagle of Georgia, had called for the restoration of the Georgian monarchy. David was granted citizenship, and a year later, married Princess Anna, daughter of the genealogically junior Grazinsky Bragration branch who were rivals to the defunct Georgian throne.  Princess Anna was, herself, a Dame of the Order. The marriage sparked widespread interest in the revival of a constitutional monarchy. The royal couple divorced in 2013, and their son Prince Giorgi, has been a Knight Grand Collar of the Order from birth.

In 2017, the Duke and Duchess of Gloucester "received the Grand Collar of the Order of the Eagle of Georgia on behalf of Her Majesty Queen Elizabeth II in honor of her 90th birthday."

The Order is recognized as a Dynastic (Non-Regnant) Order of Chivalry. In Burke's Peerage, it is listed as an Order "founded by royal claimants in exile". The International Commission on Orders of Chivalry describes it as a "new chivalric institution founded by the head of a formerly reigning dynasty". The Augustan Society notes it as a non-ruling dynastic honor.

Grand Masters of the Order

 Irakli Bagration of Mukhrani (1939–1977) 
 Jorge Bagration of Mukhrani (1977–2008)
 David Bagration of Mukhrani (2008–present)

Grades of the Order
The Order of the Eagle of Georgia is composed of the following grades:
  Knight Grand Cross with Collar 
  Knight/Dame Grand Cross 
  Knight Grand Officer 
  Knight/Dame Commander
  Knight Officer
  Knight/Dame

Recipients
Notable recipients of the order since 1939 have partially included: 
  Queen Elizabeth II of the United Kingdom
 King Umberto II of Italy
 King Boris III of Bulgaria
 King George Tupou V of Tonga
 King Leka of Albania 
 Grand Duke Vladimir Kirillovich of Russia
 Crown Prince Nicholas of Montenegro
 Prince Jaime de Borbón, Duke of Anjou and Segovia

See also
Orders, decorations, and medals of Georgia
Order of Queen Tamara (disambiguation)

References

Notes
A.It has never been clarified if Queen Elizabeth II accepted this as an honour for herself.

Sources

 

 

 
 
 

Orders, decorations, and medals of Georgia (country)
Dynastic orders